A banderole ("little banner") is a comparatively small but long flag, historically used by knights and on ships, and as a heraldic device for representing bishops.

Bannerol, in its main uses is the same as banderole, and is the term especially applied to banners about a yard square carried at the funerals of great men and placed over the tomb. Often it commemorated a particular exploit of the person bearing the coat of arms. Banderole (a wooden stick having one pointed end covered with metallic shoe) is used in conventional military survey. It's used to depict various stations established during carrying the survey forward. Double banderole are used to erect Survey Beacon.

Knights, bishops and ships
A banderole is a small flag or streamer carried on the lance of a knight, or a long narrow flag, with cleft end flying from the mast-head of a ship in battle.

In heraldry, a banderole is a streamer hanging from beneath the crook of a bishop's crosier and folding over the staff, and for other small streamers or ribbons.

Art and architecture

The term is also used in art and architecture for a speech scroll or streamer, representing a roll of parchment carried by or surrounding a figure or object, for bearing an inscription, mainly during the medieval and Renaissance periods.  In particular banderoles were used as attributes for Old Testament prophets, as may be seen in the Santa Trinita Maestà by Cimabue, (Uffizi, 1280–90), Duccio's Maestà (1308–11), and other works.  The convention had a historical appropriateness, as the Old Testament was originally written on scrolls, whereas nearly all surviving New Testament manuscripts are codices (like modern books).  They may also be used for the words of angels, especially Gabriel's greeting to Mary in Annunciation scenes.

Notes

References
 Earlier version first published in New English Dictionary, 1885.

Attribution:

Heraldry